Daskabát is a municipality and village in Olomouc District in the Olomouc Region of the Czech Republic. It has about 600 inhabitants.

History
The first written mention of the village of Otěhřiby, which was a predecessor of Daskabát, is from 1232. Otěhřiby was destroyed during the Bohemian–Hungarian War (1468–1478) and renewed in the 16th century, first under the name Nová Ves (1568) and since 1581 known as Daskabát.

References

Villages in Olomouc District